Mark Douglas may refer to:

 Mark Douglas (politician) (1829–1900), American farmer, businessman, and politician in Wisconsin
 Mark Douglas (ethicist) (born 1966), professor of Christian ethics at Columbia Theological Seminary
 Mark Douglas (cricketer) (born 1968), New Zealand cricketer